Bert Evans was a soccer (football) player,

Bert or Bertram Evans may also refer to:

Bertram Evans, cricketer

Fictional 
Bert Evans, character played by Pat Conway
Bertram Evans, character in ''House of Secrets (1936 film)

See also
Albert Evans (disambiguation)
Robert Evans (disambiguation)
Hubert Evans (disambiguation)
Herbert Evans (disambiguation)